Cal-Maine Foods, Inc. is an American fresh egg producer, established in 1969 and based in Jackson, Mississippi. Its eggs are sold mostly in mid-Atlantic, midwestern, southeastern, and southwestern states. These regions account for approximately a quarter of US egg consumption.

Cal-Maine is a public company trading on the NASDAQ, headed by its founder, Fred R. Adams, Jr., whose family owns a controlling interest.

Recent history
On May 1, 2012, Cal-Maine announced a joint venture between the cooperative Eggland's Best and Land O'Lakes. Cal-Maine was the largest franchisee of Eggland's Best and one of the company's 13 shareholders. As of 2011, 16 percent of Cal-Maine egg sales were Eggland's Best.

In 2018, an investigation at Lake Wales Farm by the animal rights group Animal Recovery Mission (ARM) indicated that chickens suffer inhumane living conditions and abuse by employees. After further investigation by the Polk County sheriff's department and the United States Department of Agriculture (USDA), it was found that the farm had followed American Veterinary Medical Association (AVMA) protocols for euthanizing poultry. No confirmation of abuse was found.

According to the San Francisco Chronicle, in response to the COVID-19 pandemic, in the spring of 2020, Cal-Maine increased egg prices some 300% - from $1 to $3.44 per dozen. This triggered at least one lawsuit challenging the price hike as unjustified, since there hadn't been an actual supply chain interruption.

Early in the morning of December17, 2020, a fire destroyed two barns at Cal-Maine's Dade City, Florida facilities. The fire killed over 240,000 chickens, including 120,000 pullets; the financial loss was estimated to be over $1 million.

Principal subsidiaries
 Cal-Maine Farms, Inc.
 Southern Equipment Distributors, Inc.
 South Texas Applicators, Inc.
 Cal-Maine Partnership, Ltd.
 CMF of Kansas, LLCads 2004

References

External links

Food manufacturers of the United States
Companies based in Jackson, Mississippi
Food and drink companies established in 1969
1969 establishments in Mississippi
Companies listed on the Nasdaq
Eggs (food)